Irene Romualdez Marcos-Araneta (born Maria Irene Celestina Romualdez Marcos; September 16, 1960) is the third child of the late former president Ferdinand Marcos and former first lady Imelda Marcos.
Irene Marcos's presence is known as being "the quiet one" because among the Marcos siblings, she is the only one not holding public office. Her best-remembered role in her father's 21-year rule involved expensive events, such as her 1983 wedding to Gregorio "Greggy" Maria Araneta III which was said to cost US$10.3 million, and for her September 1985 party on the presidential yacht BRP Ang Pangulo, whose lavishness caused a scandal when video coverage of it came out in the wake of the 1986 EDSA Revolution.

She gained media attention after being tagged in the Panama Papers leak, and for triggering student protests after her attendance in various campus events.

Controversies 
She, her mother and brother have moved for the reversal of the Sandiganbayan's decision to forfeit in favor of the government all assets, investments, securities, properties, shares, interests, and funds of Arelma Inc. being managed by Merrill Lynch Asset Management in New York.

Personal life
Marcos-Araneta is married to businessman, Gregorio  Maria Araneta III with 2 children: Alfonso (Alfie) and Luis (Louie) Araneta. She was named in the internationally controversial Panama Papers, along with her husband, Gregorio Maria Araneta III, her sister Imee Marcos and her nephews Fernando "Borgy" Manotoc, Matthew Joseph "MJ" Manotoc, and Ferdinand Richard Michael "Mike" Manotoc.

See also 
 Imee Marcos
 Bongbong Marcos
 Aimee Marcos

References

External links
Sandiganbayan asked to finalize forfeiture of $35-million Marcos account 
Irene Marcos demands return of Canlubang Mansion

1960 births
Irene
Children of presidents of the Philippines
Filipino exiles
Filipino people of Spanish descent
Living people
Irene
Filipino Roman Catholics
People named in the Panama Papers
Irene